The Jamote Qaumi Movement is a political party based in the Balochistan province of Pakistan.

The Jamot Qomi Movement was founded by Mir Gul Hassan Manjhoo Let to provide a political platform for the Jamot people of Balochistan in 1996 in Dera Murad Jamali.  The party was created on the basis of the political philosophy of Mir Abdul Malik Shaheed and Mir Murtaza Abro Shaheed (the pioneers of the anti-feudal movement in Kachhi, Balochistan).

The manifesto of the party is:
Struggle for the Jamot people in Balochistan
struggle against feudalism
the party believes the Islamic system of social justice should be implemented in the country.

Electoral History

References

1996 establishments in Pakistan
Islamic democratic political parties
Baloch nationalist organizations
Nationalist parties in Pakistan
Political parties established in 1996